The 1998 Red Bull Champions Super League was a professional non-ranking snooker tournament that took place in September 1998 in three different cities in China – Shenyang, Xi'an and Beijing.

This one-off event was held as a six-man round robin, similar to the Red Bull Super Challenge held earlier in the summer. The line-up was similar apart from John Higgins who replaced James Wattana and Au Chi-wai came in for Marco Fu. The group was won by Hendry.


Round-robin

3 points for victory & 1 point for every frame won

References

Snooker non-ranking competitions
1998 in snooker
1998 in Chinese sport
Snooker competitions in China